Aero Lloyd Flugreisen GmbH & Co, operating as Aero Lloyd, was a German charter airline based in Oberursel, Germany. It was headquartered in Building 182 at Frankfurt Airport in Frankfurt before it was moved to Oberursel.

History

Early years

Aero Lloyd was founded on September 6, 1979 and launched operations in March 1981 with three Sud Aviation Caravelles. By 1982, the airline received 3 ex-Garuda Indonesia Douglas DC-9-32 aircraft.

In 1986, the airline began to receive McDonnell Douglas MD-80 aircraft used to add new destinations. In 1988, Aero Lloyd launched scheduled services to London in the United Kingdom, Paris in France, and Zurich in Switzerland with the newly acquired aircraft. However, by 1992, Aero Lloyd dropped scheduled operations after realising it was not a good move for the airline.

In 1998, the Bayerische Landesbank took over a majority stake of 66% with the intention of selling it on to a strategic buyer. The Bayerische Landesbank was also the largest lender. In 2000, the return on sales was below 1% and thus below the industry average. In 2001 the Bayerische Landesbank had to grant a loan of 20 million euros to ensure liquidity. Aero Lloyd achieved a market share of around 12% in 2002, but suffered from overcapacities on the market.

Collapse
The airline ceased operations on October 16, 2003 after shareholders refused to continue funding the airline. The collapse left 4,000 passengers stuck at German airports and 4,500 stuck overseas. Its assets were acquired by Aero Lloyd founder, Bogomir Gradisnik. Under the management of Gradisnik's associate, Miso Aksmanovic, the company was reshaped into a smaller charter operation named Aero Flight which was established in March 2004 and started operations on March 26, 2004. Aero Flight ceased operations in October 30, 2005.

Fleet

The Aero Lloyd fleet consisted of the following aircraft throughout operations:

Accidents and incidents
On September 1, 2001, an Aero lloyd Airbus A321-200, operating a charter flight from Catania-Fontanarossa Airport, Italy to Berlin Tegel Airport, Germany, had an attempted hijacking shortly after takeoff. The plane was diverted to Naples Airport in Italy where it made an emergency landing and the hijacker was arrested. There is a mix of reports ranging from the man using wax candles as dynamite and that of a panic attack. Nobody was injured in the incident.

On July 1, 2002, Aero Lloyd flight 1135, an Airbus A320-200, was running behind schedule and did not reach Friedrichshafen Airport until after the allotted arrival time for passenger flights. The region's Zürich-based traffic control centre was not expecting to handle any more landings that night and therefore only had a single controller working the late-night shift, despite regulations that required at least two controllers on duty at all times. Although flight 1135 ultimately landed safely, the controller's efforts to assist this flight had repeatedly distracted him from his prior responsibility to handle high-altitude traffic in the Lake Constance region; this was cited by investigators as a major contributing factor in the nearby mid-air collision above Überlingen, which occurred while flight 1135 was preparing to land.

See also
List of defunct airlines of Germany

References

External links

Companies based in Hesse
Defunct airlines of Germany
Airlines established in 1979
Airlines disestablished in 2003
1979 establishments in West Germany
Oberursel
German companies established in 1979
German companies disestablished in 2003